Jean Marie Henri (Soesoe) van Oostrom Soede (25 October 1911 in Groede – 18 December 1939 in Wassenaar) was a Dutch water polo player who competed in the 1936 Summer Olympics.

He was part of the Dutch team which finished fifth in the 1936 tournament. He played all seven matches.

References 
 Olympics at Sports-Reference.com

1911 births
1939 deaths
Dutch male water polo players
Olympic water polo players of the Netherlands
People from Sluis
Water polo players at the 1936 Summer Olympics
Sportspeople from Zeeland